The list of current and past Rajya Sabha members from the Jharkhand State. State elect six members for the term of six years. They are indirectly elected by the state legislators of Jharkhand state, since 2002 biennial elections to Rajya Sabha. As per the Bihar Reorganisation Act 2000, these six seats are allocated to Jharkhand state from Bihar State, reducing Bihar seats from 22 to 16 seats, since 15 November 2000.

List of all Rajya Sabha members from Jharkhand state 
Alphabetical list by last name

The list is incomplete.
 Star (*) represents current Rajya Sabha members from JH state.

References

External links
Rajya Sabha homepage hosted by the Indian government
List of Sitting Members of Rajya Sabha (Term Wise) 
MEMBERS OF RAJYA SABHA (STATE WISE RETIREMENT LIST) 

Jharkhand
 
Rajya Sabha